Gian Marco Ferrari (born 15 May 1992) is an Italian professional footballer who plays as a defender for Serie A club Sassuolo and the Italy national team.

Club career
Ferrari joined Renate on loan from Parma in the summer of 2011.

On 3 July 2013, he joined Gubbio in a co-ownership deal for €300,000, with Cristian Damiano having also been signed by Parma for the same price. In June 2014 Parma bought Ferrari back for €200,000, bought Luca Procacci outright for €200,000, and sold Giuliano Laezza outright to Gubbio also for €200,000.

On 3 July 2014, he was signed by Crotone on a temporary deal.

In June 2015 Crotone excised the option to sign Ferrari on a permanent deal.

Sassuolo
On 31 August 2016, fellow Serie A club Sassuolo signed Ferrari from Crotone. Ferrari, Diego Falcinelli and Marcello Trotta also joined Crotone on loan for 2016–17 Serie A season.

On 4 August 2017, Ferrari was signed by another Serie A club U.C. Sampdoria.

International career
Ferrari was called up to the senior Italy squad for friendlies against Argentina and England in March 2018.

On 28 May 2021, Ferrari scored his first goal for Italy in a 7–0 home win over San Marino.

Career statistics

Scores and results list Italy's goal tally first, score column indicates score after each Ferrari goal.

References

External links
 

Living people
1992 births
Sportspeople from Parma
Association football defenders
Italian footballers
Italy international footballers
Serie A players
Serie B players
Serie C players
Serie D players
Parma Calcio 1913 players
Monticelli Terme players
Crociati Noceto players
U.S. Fiorenzuola 1922 S.S. players
A.C. Renate players
A.S. Gubbio 1910 players
F.C. Crotone players
U.S. Sassuolo Calcio players
U.C. Sampdoria players
Footballers from Emilia-Romagna